Patof is a character in the highly successful Canadian children's television series Patofville. He was portrayed by actor-comedian Jacques Desrosiers.

Television, performances, and comics
In January 1972, the clown Patof made his appearance in the series Le Cirque du Capitaine on the French-language Quebec television station CFTM-TV Channel 10. He hosted three different series: Patofville, Patof raconte, and Patof voyage.

Patof told jokes and stories characterized by puns and often ended his numbers by exclaiming "On m'applaudit!!!" (applaud me!!!)

He had a successful recording career during the 1970s. Songs like "Patof Blou" (1972), "Patof le roi des clowns" (1972), "Patofville" (1973), "L'éléphant Tic-Tac" (1973), "La plus belle poupée du monde" (1973), "Bienvenue dans ma bottine" (1974), "Gros minou" (1975), and "Bonjour Patof" (1975) are among his greatest hits.

Patof participated in the Shriner Circus in 1973 and 1974, at the Montreal Forum.

He recorded an English single called "The King of Clowns".

Some of Patof's adventures were released as recordings and comic strips, including Patof en Russie, Patof chez les esquimaux, Patof chez les coupeurs de têtes, Patof dans la baleine, Patof chez les petits hommes verts, Patof chez les cowboys, Patof raconte, Patof découvre un ovni, Patof en Chine, and Patof chez les dinosaures.

Character background
The character's full name is Gregor Patof. According to his background story, he was born in Bobruisk, Belarus. Patof's father was a clown, and he and his wife both worked for a circus in Moscow. Patof lost his father at the age of six, and his mother died a few years later, reportedly from laughter after seeing a bearded woman.

As an orphan, Patof went to work at a circus. Everything in his environment reminded him of his parents, however, so he decided to leave. Not wishing to drastically alter his climate, he moved to Montreal in Canada, a city as cold as Moscow.

He was lucky to meet "Capitaine Bonhomme" who, always ready to help, found him clowning work on television. Patof rapidly became popular with children. Making numerous personal, unpaid appearances at hospitals and orphanages, he won many hearts.

Besides being a clown, Patof is also the mayor of Patofville, a fancy city filled with surprises for young and old alike, where he lives with his friends Boulik, Polpon, and Itof.

Characters

Patof
Gregor Patof is a Russian clown and the central character of Patofville, of which he is also the mayor. He appears for the first time in the television series Le cirque du capitaine. His costume consists of red pants and a tweed fitted coat with collar and matched cuffs. He wears enormous red shoes named "tatanes". In Patofville, he lives in a big yellow bootee. He is also the director of the Patof Circus.

Polpon
Mister Polpon is the police and fire brigade chief of Patofville. The best friend and confidant of Patof, he lives in a huge teapot, which doubles as a prison.

Itof
General Itof is a Russian spy whose mission is to return Patof to Moscow. Inventor, imitator, and practical joker, he is also a master in the art of disguise. He wears a Cossack's traditional costume as well as a surprising moustache, which transforms according to its own wishes. In Patofville, he lives in a huge pumpkin.

Boulik
Boulik (full name: Boulik Scavanovitch) is Patof's faithful dog. Stemming from the famous Toutousavanski race, he can speak and goes crazy when he sees a cat.

Minor characters
 Patof Circus members: Patof Circus is composed of the fortune teller Madam Sauratout, the acrobats "Les Fabuleux Risquetout", the giant Pandemur, the elastic man Sétir, the two dwarves Fromage and Chocolat, the tamer Mister Desfauves, the mahouts and elephant trainers "Pachy et Derme", as well as the ringmaster, Turira.
 Patof Circus animals: Among the main attractions at the circus are the performing horses Macaron and Macaroni, Bananof the gorilla, and Tic-Tac the elephant.
 Amikwan
 Fafouin
 Madeleine
 Midas
 Monsieur Qui
 Monsieur Tranquille
 Uncle Tom
 Tut-Tut

Filmography

Television series
 Le cirque du Capitaine (1972–1973)
 Patofville (1973–1976)
 Patof raconte (1975–1976)
 Patof voyage (1976–1977)

DVDs
 Bonjour Patof (20111)

Discography

Albums

Singles

Compilations

Collaborations and performances as guest star

Charts

Meritas hit parade chart
On the Meritas chart, which was the most reliable chart list in Quebec at the beginning of the 1970s, Patof Blou reached #1 during two weeks on 16 September 1972 and Patof le roi des clowns reached #7 on 30 December 1972. Jacques Desrosiers received two golden records for the two singles.

Reconstituted chart

Songs 
Title / Date / Best rank / Weeks on chart
 1972 "Patof Blou" / 1972-07-01 / #1 / 16 weeks on chart
 1972 "Patof le roi des clowns" / 1972-10-21 / #2 / 22 weeks on chart
 1973 "Oh! Les enfants" / 1973-04-07 / #14 / 5 weeks on chart
 1973 "Patofville" / 1973-09-01 / #15 / 19 weeks on chart
 1974 "Bonjour les enfants" / 1974-01-12 / #15 / 11 weeks on chart
 1974 "Bienvenue dans ma bottine" / 1974-11-16 / #31 / 1 week on chart

Albums
Title / Date / Best rank / Weeks on Top 30
 1972 Patof en Russie / 1972-09-23 / #5 / 7 weeks in Top 30
 1972 Patof dans la baleine / 1972-12
 1972 Patof chez les petits hommes verts / 1972-12
 1972 Patof chez les cowboys / 1972-12
 1973 Patof chante 10 chansons pour tous les enfants du monde / 1973-05
 1974 Patofville – Patof chante pour toi / 1974-03
 1974 Bienvenue dans ma bottine / 1974-12
 1975 Patof le roi des clowns / 1975-04
 1975 Amikwan – Koi koi ayaho / 1975-04
 1980 Nestor et Patof – Pour tous / 1980-05

Bibliography
 1972 Patof raconte, Éditions de l'Homme
 1972 Patofun, Éditions de l'Homme
 1972 Cuisinons avec Patof, Éditions de l'Homme
 1973 Patof découvre un ovni, Éditions Mirabel
 1974 Patof en Chine, Éditions Mirabel
 1976 Patof chez les dinosaures, Éditions Mirabel
 2009 Une journée à Patofville, Éditions Les Intouchables (Non-canon)
 2009 Patof à la rescousse de la forêt, Éditions Les Intouchables (Non-canon)
 2009 Patof et le monstre du lac, Éditions Les Intouchables (Non-canon)

References

External links
 French blog about Patof and Jacques Desrosiers

Television characters introduced in 1972
Fictional clowns
Fictional Russian people
Television shows filmed in Quebec
1970s Canadian children's television series
1972 Canadian television series debuts
1978 Canadian television series endings
TVA (Canadian TV network) original programming
Television shows about clowns